Zoa Peak 1872 m (6142 ft) is a mountain peak adjacent to the Coquihalla River in British Columbia.  There is a trail that starts from the same location of the Falls Lake trail.

The name is one of a group of names in this area known as the Llamoid Group or Asian Group among climbers.  A "zoa" is the progeny of a cattle bull and a nak (a female yak).

Peak panorama

References

One-thousanders of British Columbia
Canadian Cascades
Yale Division Yale Land District